The Duisburg tramway network is a network of tramways forming part of the public transport system in Duisburg, a city in the federal state of North Rhine-Westphalia, Germany.

It now forms part of the larger Duisburg Stadtbahn system, which in turn makes up part of the Rhine-Ruhr Stadtbahn system.

Lines 
, the Duisburg tramway network had the following lines:

Rolling stock
43 type GT10NC-DU trams are operated in Duisburg, which were built by Duewag from 1986 until 1993. The first of 47 new Bombardier Flexity trams was delivered in 2020, which are scheduled to replace the old trams.

See also
List of town tramway systems in Germany
Trams in Germany

References

Notes

Bibliography

External links

 
 

Transport in Duisburg
Duisburg
Metre gauge railways in Germany
750 V DC railway electrification
Duisburg